Vijai Sharma is former Chief Information Commissioner of India.

References

Indian Administrative Service officers
1950 births
Living people